The Neon Antonov-class coastal logistics ship, also known as Project 1595, is a Russian Coast Guard vessel. The vessels were designed to supply Border Guard installations in the Pacific Ocean. They can also assist in other standard Russian Coast Guard missions such as protecting Russian maritime borders, search and rescue, and maritime law enforcement.

Design
The ships are small freighters that carry defensive armament to engage surface and air threats. The 30 mm gun is controlled by a Kolonka-1 ring sight fire control director. The ships have a basic suite of sensors and systems for navigation and communicating to other ships or land areas. They can carry small landing craft and one work-boat. The ships are equipped with 2 x 3750 hp 67E diesels, 2 fixed pitch propellers, 3 x 300 kW diesel generators, allowing them to reach a top speed of 18 knots. The ships usually carry roughly 940 tons of cargo.

See also
List of ships of Russia by project number

References

ship classes
Ships of Russia